Lu Yuegang(卢跃刚), a  Sichuan native in China, is a journalist and a writer of non-fiction. He has been a reporter of China Youth Daily for ten years. He was promoted to be the deputy director and later the principal reporter of the news centre in China Youth Daily. Meanwhile, he also serves as the Chairman of the China Association for the Study of Nonfiction. Over the years, he has won several prizes for his reportages.

External links 
 Lu Yuegang's webpage in Chinese (卢跃刚個人主頁)

Living people
People's Republic of China journalists
Writers from Sichuan
Year of birth missing (living people)
People's Republic of China novelists
People's Republic of China essayists